Château Viale is a chateau in the hills to the north of Kpalimé, in the Kloto Prefecture of Togo.

It was built by the French in the early 1940s and consists of a main building and a tower. The building is owned by the Togolese government and is used for cabinet meetings. In the past presidents such as Félix Houphouët-Boigny and Abdou Diouf have stayed at the chateau. It underwent renovation in 1979.

References

Houses in Togo
Châteaux
French colonisation in Africa